Naka Kalan is a village of Jhelum District in the Punjab province of Pakistan. Its original name is Nakka Kalān.

References

Populated places in Jhelum District